Miraclathurella entemma is an extinct species of sea snail, a marine gastropod mollusk in the family Pseudomelatomidae, the turrids and allies.

Description

Distribution
Fossils of this species were found in Miocene strata in the Bowden Formation, Jamaica.

References

 W. P. Woodring. 1928. Miocene Molluscs from Bowden, Jamaica. Part 2: Gastropods and discussion of results. Contributions to the Geology and Palaeontology of the West Indies

External links
 Fossilworks: Euclathurella (Miraclathurella) entemma

entemma
Gastropods described in 1928